HMNZS Hickleton (M1131) was a  that operated in the Royal Navy and the Royal New Zealand Navy (RNZN). She was named after a small village near Doncaster.

Built for the Royal Navy by John I Thornycroft of Southampton, the minesweeper was launched on 26 January 1955 and later commissioned as HMS Hickleton

She was commissioned into the RNZN in 1965 and decommissioned in 1966. After leaving New Zealand service, she was transferred to the Argentine Navy and renamed ARA Neuquen (M1).

Operational history

United Kingdom

New Zealand
Early in 1965, Indonesia was employing a policy of confrontation against Malaysia. New Zealand agreed to assist Malaysia by deploying two Royal Navy minesweepers then in reserve at Singapore. These were commissioned into the RNZN on 10 April 1965 and joined the Royal Navy's 11th Minesweeping squadron (also Ton class), taking part in anti-infiltration patrols in Malaysian waters.

In her first year Hickleton, together with her sister ship , carried out 200 patrols, with 20 incidents involving intruding Indonesians, often taking as prisoners those aboard the intercepted craft. By the time the Indonesian confrontation policy ended in August 1966 Santon had steamed . Following the withdrawal of Commonwealth ships from the anti-infiltration patrols, the RNZN crew took her back to England, where she paid off in reserve at Portsmouth.

Argentina
The ship was subsequently sold to Argentina and renamed Neuquen (M1). She was decommissioned in 1996.

See also
Minesweepers of the Royal New Zealand Navy

References

Notes

Bibliography 
 McDougall, R J (1989) New Zealand Naval Vessels. pp. 83–84. Government Printing Office. 
 Wright, Gerry (2006) A Kiwi on our Funnel: The story of HMNZ Ships Hickleton and Santon, Zenith Print and Design. 

Ships built in Southampton
1955 ships
Cold War minesweepers of the United Kingdom
Ton-class minesweepers of the Royal New Zealand Navy
Ships built by John I. Thornycroft & Company